The 2015 Russia Open Grand Prix was the thirteenth grand prix gold and grand prix tournament of the 2015 BWF Grand Prix Gold and Grand Prix. The tournament was held in Sports Hall Olympic, Vladivostok, Russia July 21 until July 26, 2015 and had a total purse of 50,000.

Players by nation

Men's singles

Seeds

 Tommy Sugiarto (champion)
 Brice Leverdez (3rd Round)
 Ajay Jayaram (semi-final)
 Zulfadli Zulkiffli (semi-final)
 Chong Wei Feng (quarter-final)
 Pablo Abián (quarter-final)
 Joachim Persson (withdrew)
 Misha Zilberman (quarter-final)
 Petr Koukal (2nd Round)
 Thomas Rouxel (W/O)
 Vladimir Malkov (quarter-final)
 Howard Shu (2nd Round)
 Luka Wraber (final)
 Henri Hurskainen (3rd Round)
 David Obernosterer (3rd Round)
 Eetu Heino (3rd Round)

Finals

Top half

Section 1

Section 2

Section 3

Section 4

Bottom half

Section 5

Section 6

Section 7

Section 8

Women's singles

Seeds

 Karin Schnaase (1st Round)
 Linda Zetchiri (2nd Round)
 Iris Wang (quarter-final)
 Sabrina Jaquet (withdrew)
 Rong Schafer (1st Round)
 Jamie Subandhi (quarter-final)
 Ksenia Polikarpova (1st Round)
 Natalia Perminova (quarter-final)

Finals

Top half

Section 1

Section 2

Bottom half

Section 3

Section 4

Men's doubles

Seeds

 Vladimir Ivanov / Ivan Sozonov (champion)
 Goh V Shem / Tan Wee Kiong (final)
 Manu Attri / B. Sumeeth Reddy (semi-final)
 Marcus Ellis / Chris Langridge (1st Round)
 Phillip Chew / Sattawat Pongnairat (1st Round)
 Baptiste Careme / Ronan Labar (1st Round)
 Koo Kien Keat / Tan Boon Heong (quarter-final)
 Lu Ching-Yao / Tien Tzu-Chieh (withdrew)

Finals

Top half

Section 1

Section 2

Bottom half

Section 3

Section 4

Women's doubles

Seeds

 Gabriela Stoeva / Stefani Stoeva (champion)
 Johanna Goliszewski / Carla Nelte (final)
 Ekaterina Bolotova / Evgeniya Kosetskaya (quarter-final)
 Pradnya Gadre / N. Siki Reddy (withdrew)

Finals

Top half

Section 1

Section 2

Bottom half

Section 3

Section 4

Mixed doubles

Seeds

 Phillip Chew / Jamie Subandhi (2nd Round)
 Evgenij Dremin / Evgenia Dimova (quarter-final)
 Vitalij Durkin / Nina Vislova (semi-final)
 Ronan Labar / Emilie Lefel (quarter-final)

Finals

Top half

Section 1

Section 2

Bottom half

Section 3

Section 4

References

External links
 Results

Open Grand Prix
Sport in Vladivostok
Russia Open Grand Prix
Russian Open (badminton)